Events from the year 1691 in China.

Incumbents 
 Kangxi Emperor (29th year)

Events 
 Public Security Police Force of Macau#History: Law enforcement was first taken by the military stationed in Portuguese Macau, with Portuguese Navy troops at first before the Portuguese Army stepped in to take over internal security duties on 14 March 1691.

References

 
 .

 
China